Semiulla Wafin (also 'Vafa'; February 2, 1909 – December 18, 1983) was a Tatar shopkeeper, leader, publisher and a teacher in Tampere, where for decades he operated a successful fabric shop his father had established in early 1900s. He moved from Russia to Finland as a child.

Life 
Semiulla Wafin (Sämiulla Wafa) was born in Russian Empire, Nizhny Novgorod Governorate - a village named Aktuk. As a child, he moved to Terijoki with his parents and eventually to Tampere, where they settled.

Wafin went to work at his father Zinnetulla’s fabric shop "S. Wafin" in 1925. Semiulla took over the shop after his father passed and operated it during 1941-1982. It was located in Aleksis Kiven katu.

Wafin was a founding member and a member of the board of The Tampere Islamic Congregation. He was the chairman from 1951 until his death in 1983. Wafin was also involved in the founding of The Tampere Turkish Society, and for many years operated at the board.

Among the local Tatar community, Semiulla Wafin was known as a determined cultural influencer, who with his actions tried his best to develop and conserve the Tatar culture in Finland. He published books, such as in 1962, with imam Habiburrahman Shakir a booklet named "Din derésleré ve Islam tarihçese", and with local artist Aisa Hakimcan a reprint of a 1908 book released originally in Kazan named "Islām dīne ḥaqq dīnder".

Wafin was married to Mahrusa Allayarı (1911-1984), who he met during his economic studies in Berlin. Mahrusa was originally form Xinjang. Among the Finnish Tatar community she, like her husband was an active cultural influencer who for example served at the board of the Tampere Turkish Society and wrote for Ayaz Ishaki's magazine Yaña Milli Yul as "M. Wafa". In Berlin, Mahrusa graduated as a dentist and before this she had studied in Istanbul. Father of Mahrusa was a wealthy landowner Zakircan Allayarı (né Aldargarov), who with his brother Siddik founded libraries.

Semiulla Wafin was interesed in Turkish language and taught it for the children of his community. He was in extensive correspondence with Turkic people abroad and wrote to them about the lives of Tatars in Tampere.

During the Continuation War, Wafin served as a corporal and was awarded afterwards. He and his wife are buried at Vatiala Cemetery, located in Kangasala. The Wafin's had children Batu, Urhan and Fuat. Father-Zinnetulla had arrived to Finland the first time in 1900 to visit his uncle Mustafa Ismail. He established his successful shop in 1910. In his memorial letter, A. Hakimcan described Möshfika, the mother of Semiulla as "the mother of the people".

Versions of name 
Semiulla Wafin/Vafa.

Literary Tatar: Сәмигулла Вафин; Sämiğulla Wafin. (Wafa/Вафа without Russian suffix).

Mishar Dialect: Сәмиулла; Sämiulla. (Alternatively Səmiğulla/Sәmiulla).

Given name means "He who listens to Allah".

References 

Finnish Tatars
Finnish publishers (people)
1909 births
1983 deaths